Fritz Becker (13 September 1888 – 22 February 1963) was a German professional footballer who played as a forward.

Biography
He played for FC Germania 1894 Frankfurt before moving to FC Frankfurter Kickers (later to be known as Eintracht Frankfurt).  He played for the Frankfurt club from 1904 to 1921.

In 1907 he was selected to a Frankfurt city XI that would play Newcastle United, and Becker scored two goals against the reigning English champions. After his glowing performance, he was invited to a test match in order to form a German national team.

On 5 April 1908, Becker went down in history as one of the eleven footballers who played in the first game of the German national team in an 
friendly against Switzerland, in which he scored the first-ever goal in the team's history. Despite scoring twice for his country, Becker ended up on the losing side with Germany going down 5-3. This was the only match he ever played for Germany.

Becker acted several times as the club's sports director, most recently in 1946–47. In his professional life, he worked as a councilor in the city's administration.

Fritz Becker was honorary club member and honorary captain at Eintracht Frankfurt.

Honours 
 Nordkreis-Liga
 Champion: 1911–12+, 1912–13+, 1913–14+
 Southern German Championship
 Runner-up: 1912–13+, 1913–14+
 + As Frankfurter FV
 Kreisliga Nordmain Champion''': 1919–20+, 1920–21

References

Sources

1888 births
1963 deaths
Footballers from Frankfurt
German footballers
Germany international footballers
VfL Germania 1894 players
Eintracht Frankfurt players
Association football forwards